The 2015 Vancouver International Film Festival, the 34th event in the history of the Vancouver International Film Festival, was held from September 24 to October 9, 2015.

The festival's opening gala film was John Crowley's Brooklyn, and its closing gala was Marc Abraham's I Saw the Light.

Awards
Award winners were announced on October 9.

Films

Special Presentations
Arabian Nights — Miguel Gomes
Beeba Boys — Deepa Mehta
Dheepan — Jacques Audiard
High-Rise — Ben Wheatley
Ingrid Bergman: In Her Own Words (Jag är Ingrid) — Stig Björkman
Louder Than Bombs — Joachim Trier
Room — Lenny Abrahamson
A Tale of Three Cities — Mabel Cheung
This Changes Everything — Avi Lewis
Youth — Paolo Sorrentino

Canadian Images
The Amina Profile (Le profil Amina) — Sophie Deraspe
Borealis — Sean Garrity
Charlotte's Song — Nicholas Humphries
Le Dep — Sonia Boileau
The Devout — Connor Gaston
A Dog's Life (Chienne de vie) — Hélène Choquette
Eadweard — Kyle Rideout
Fire Song — Adam Garnet Jones
The Forbidden Room — Guy Maddin, Evan Johnson
Fractured Land — Damien Gillis, Fiona Rayher
Frank and the Wondercat — Tony Massil, Pablo Alvarez Mesa
Hadwin's Judgement — Sasha Snow
Haida Gwaii: On the Edge of the World — Charles Wilkinson
The Heart of Madame Sabali (Le cœur de Madame Sabali) — Ryan McKenna
Hurt — Alan Zweig
Hyena Road — Paul Gross
Into the Forest — Patricia Rozema
Michael Shannon Michael Shannon John — Chelsea McMullan
My Good Man's Gone — Nick Citton
My Internship in Canada (Guibord s'en va-t-en guerre) — Philippe Falardeau
Ninth Floor — Mina Shum
No Men Beyond This Point — Mark Sawers
O, Brazen Age — Alexander Carson
Our Loved Ones (Les êtres chers) — Anne Émond
Painted Land: In Search of the Group of Seven — Phyllis Ellis
The Pass System — Alex Williams
Remember — Atom Egoyan
The Sandwich Nazi — Lewis Bennett
Sleeping Giant — Andrew Cividino
The Sound of Trees — François Péloquin
Tricks on the Dead: The Story of the Chinese Labour Corps in WWI — Jordan Paterson
Ville-Marie — Guy Édoin

Cinema of Our Time
31st October — Shivaji Lotan Patil
45 Years — Andrew Haigh
600 Miles (600 Millas) — Gabriel Ripstein
Absence (Ausência) — Chico Teixeira
Accused (Lucia de B.) — Paula van der Oest
Adama — Simon Rouby
Ayanda — Sara Blecher
The Boda Boda Thieves (Abbabi ba boda boda) — Donald Mugisha, James Tayler
Body (Ciało) — Małgorzata Szumowska
Bravo! (Aferim!) — Radu Jude
Breathe (Umphefumlo) — Mark Dornford-May
Chevalier — Athina Rachel Tsangari
Chronic — Michel Franco
The Club (El Club) — Pablo Larraín
The Daughter — Simon Stone
Dead Slow Ahead — Mauro Herce
Decor — Ahmad Abdalla
The Dinner (I nostri ragazzi) — Ivano De Matteo
Embrace of the Serpent (El abrazo de la serpiente) — Ciro Guerra
Entertainment — Rick Alverson
Experimenter — Michael Almereyda
The Falling — Carol Morley
Francofonia — Alexander Sokurov
Golden Kingdom — Brian Perkins
Greenery Will Bloom Again (Torneranno i prati) — Ermanno Olmi
Hilda — Andrés Clariond Rangel
Home Care (Domácí péče) — Slávek Horák
I Am Nojoom, Age 10 and Divorced — Khadija al-Salami
I Promise You Anarchy (Te Prometo Anarquía) — Julio Hernández Cordón
In Your Arms (I dine hænder) — Samanou Acheche Sahlstrøm
It's Already Tomorrow in Hong Kong — Emily Ting
Ivy (Sarmaşık) — Tolga Karaçelik
Ixcanul — Jayro Bustamante
Jafar Panahi's Taxi — Jafar Panahi
James White — Josh Mond
The Lobster — Yorgos Lanthimos
London Road — Rufus Norris
Lost and Beautiful (Bella e perduta) — Pietro Marcello
Love Among the Ruins (Amore tra le rovine) — Massimo Ali Mohammad
Love, Theft and Other Entanglements (Al-Hob wa Al-Sariqa wa Mashakel Ukhra) — Muayad Alayan
Magallanes — Salvador del Solar
The Magic Mountain — Anca Damian
Marshland (La isla mínima) — Alberto Rodríguez Librero
The Mask from San (Le Masque de San) — Jacques Sarasin
Men Go to Battle — Zachary Treitz
The Movement (El Movimiento) — Benjamin Naishtat
Mustang — Deniz Gamze Ergüven
My Skinny Sister (Min lilla syster) — Sanna Lenken
Nahid — Ida Panahandeh
Nasty Baby — Sebastián Silva
One Floor Below (Un etaj mai jos) — Radu Muntean
Paradise (Ma dar Behesht) — Sina Ataeian Dena
Paulina (La Patota) — Santiago Mitre
A Perfect Day — Fernando León de Aranoa
Pioneer Heroes — Natalia Kudryashova
The Project of the Century (La Obra del siglo) — Carlos Quintela
Rainbow Island (Jazireh-ye Rangin) — Khosrow Sinai
Rams (Hrútar) — Grímur Hákonarson
Schneider vs. Bax — Alex van Warmerdam
The Second Mother (Que Horas Ela Volta?) — Anna Muylaert
Short Skin (I Dolori del giovane Edo) — Duccio Chiarini
The Sky Trembles and the Earth Is Afraid and the Two Eyes Are Not Brothers — Ben Rivers
Slackjaw — Zach Weintraub
Son of Saul (Saul fia) — László Nemes
Songs My Brothers Taught Me — Chloé Zhao
Sparrows (Þrestir) — Rúnar Rúnarsson
The Summer of Sangailė (Sangailės vasara) — Alantė Kavaitė
Three Windows and a Hanging (Tri Dritare dhe një Varje) — Isa Qosja
Tough Love (Härte) — Rosa von Praunheim
The Treasure (Comoara) — Corneliu Porumboiu
The Two of Us — Ernest Nkosi
Umrika — Prashant Nair
Victoria — Sebastian Schipper
Wednesday, May 9 (Chaharshanbeh, 19 Ordibehesht) — Vahid Jalilvand
Wondrous Boccaccio (Maraviglioso Boccaccio) — Paolo and Vittorio Taviani

Spotlight on France
The Anarchists (Les Anarchistes) — Elie Wajeman
Anton Tchékhov 1890 — René Féret
Disorder (Maryland) — Alice Winocour
In the Shadow of Women (L'Ombre des femmes) — Philippe Garrel
The Last Hammer Blow (Le Dernier Coup de marteau) — Alix Delaporte
The Measure of a Man (La Loi du marché) — Stéphane Brizé
My Friend Victoria (Mon amie Victoria) — Jean-Paul Civeyrac
My Golden Days (Trois souvenirs de ma jeunesse) — Arnaud Desplechin
Portrait of the Artist (Le Dos rouge) — Antoine Barraud
Standing Tall (La Tête haute) — Emmanuelle Bercot
Vincent (Vincent n'a pas d'écailles) — Thomas Salvador
We Did It on a Song (Chante ton bac d'abord) — David André

Documentaries
3 1/2 Minutes, 10 Bullets — Marc Silver
Above and Below — Nicolas Steiner
Alice Cares — Sander Burger
All Eyes and Ears — Vanessa Hope
Among the Believers — Hemal Trivedi, Mohammed Ali Naqvi
Banking Nature — Denis Delestrac, Sandrine Feydel
Brand: A Second Coming — Ondi Timoner
City of Gold — Laura Gabbert
Containment — Peter Galison, Robb Moss
Dark Horse: The Incredible True Story of Dream Alliance — Louise Osmond
Deep Time — Noah Hutton
Drunk Stoned Brilliant Dead — Douglas Tirola
Ever the Land — Sarah Grohnert
Falciani's Tax Bomb: The Man Behind the Swiss Leaks — Ben Lewis
A Flickering Truth — Pietra Brettkelly
From Scotland with Love — Virginia Heath
Hannah: Buddhism's Untold Journey — Adam Penny, Marta György-Kessler
Homme Less — Thomas Wirthenson
Hurricane — Andy Byatt
Ice and the Sky (La Glace et le ciel) — Luc Jacquet
In Transit — Albert Maysles, Lynn True, David Usui, Nelson Walker III, Benjamin Wu
Jumbo Wild — Nick Waggoner
Meru — Jimmy Chin, Elizabeth Chai Vasarhelyi
The Messenger — Su Rynard
Ming of Harlem: Twenty One Storeys in the Air — Phillip Warnell
A Nazi Legacy: What Our Fathers Did — David Evans
One Million Dubliners — Aoife Kelleher
Palio — Cosima Spender
The Pearl Button (El botón de nácar) — Patricio Guzmán
Racing Extinction — Louie Psihoyos
Requiem for the American Dream — Peter D. Hutchison, Kelly Nyks, Jared P. Scott
The Royal Road — Jenni Olson
Sam Klemke's Time Machine — Matthew Bate
Steak (R)evolution — Franck Ribière
A Syrian Love Story — Sean McAllister
Topophilia — Peter Bo Rappmund
Very Semi-Serious — Leah Wolchok
The Visit (An Alien Encounter) — Michael Madsen

Dragons & Tigers
32 + 4 — Chan Hon Chun
100 Yen Love — Masaharu Take
The Assassin — Hou Hsiao-hsien
Alice in Earnestland — Ahn Gooc-jin
Am I Dreaming of Others, or Are Others Dreaming of Me? — Shigeo Arikawa
Big Father, Small Father and Other Stories — Phan Đăng Di
Cemetery of Splendour — Apichatpong Weerasethakul
The Chinese Mayor — Zhou Hao
The Classified File — Kwak Kyung-taek
The Console — Mitsuo Toyama
Dark Mixer — Hirotoshi Iwasaki
Gonin Saga — Takashi Ishii
Goodbye Utopia — Ding Shiwei
Greed: Ghost Light — Kim Nakyung
I Can't Breathe — Sayaka Kihata
Kaili Blues — Bi Gan
Kim — Shumpei Shimizu
Li Wen at East Lake — Luo Li
Love And... — Zhang Lü
Master Blaster — Sawako Kabuki
A Matter of Interpretation — Lee Kwang-kuk
A Midsummer's Fantasia — Jang Kun-jae
Morning (Asa) + News — Takeshi Beat
Mountains May Depart — Jia Zhangke
Mr. Zhang Believes — Qiu Jiongjiong
Murmur of the Hearts — Sylvia Chang
My Life with a King — Carlo Encisco Catu
Octopus — Isamu Hirabayashi
Omura Plant Specimens — Natsumi Sudo
Perfect Conjugal Bliss — Zhong Su
A Place to Name — Ataru Sakagami
Port of Call — Philip Yung
Reflection — Yoju Matsubayashi
Rolling — Masanori Tominaga
Siti — Eddie Cahyono
Tandem — King Palisoc
Thanatos, Drunk — Chang Tso-chi
Tharlo — Pema Tseden
Three Stories of Love — Ryōsuke Hashiguchi
Veil — Yoriko Mizushiri
What Happened in Past Dragon Year — Sun Xun
Yanji — Park Ki-yong
Zinnia Flower — Tom Lin Shu-yu

Altered States
Aaaaaaaah! — Steve Oram
Cop Car — Jon Watts
Crumbs — Miguel Llansó
Deathgasm — Jason Lei Howden
The Demolisher — Gabriel Carrer
Green Room — Jeremy Saulnier
The Nightmare (Der Nachtmahr) — Achim Bornhak
Nina Forever — Ben Blaine, Chris Blaine
Observance — Joseph Sims-Dennett
The Similars (Los Parecidos) — Isaac Ezban

Arts & Letters
808 — Alexander Dunn
Argentina (Zonda, folclore argentino) — Carlos Saura
A Ballerina's Tale — Nelson George
Circus Without Borders: The Story of Artcirq and Kalabante — Susan Gray
The Competition — Angel Borrego Cubero
The Dream of Shahrazad — François Verster
Erbarme dich: Matthäus Passion Stories — Ramon Gieling
Hockney — Randall Wright
Imperfect Harmony — Carmen Cobos
Innocence of Memories — Grant Gee
Invention — Mark Lewis
Landfill Harmonic — Brad Allgood, Graham Townsley
Love Is All — Kim Longinotto
Magicarena — Andrea Prandstaller, Niccolo Bruna
Mavis! — Jessica Edwards
Monty Python: The Meaning of Live — Roger Graef, James Rogan
No Land's Song — Ayat Najafi
Original Copy — Florian Heinzen-Ziob
Paco de Lucía: A Journey (Paco de Lucía: La búsqueda) — Francisco Sánchez Varela
Peggy Guggenheim: Art Addict — Lisa Immordino Vreeland
Sound of Redemption: The Frank Morgan Story — N. C. Heikin
Tana Bana — Pat Murphy
The Thoughts That Once We Had — Thom Andersen

Canadian Short Films
4 Quarters — Ashley McKenzie
At the Beach — Jeremy Peter Allen
Balmoral Hotel — Wayne Wapeemukwa
Big Brother — Lucas Hrubizna
Big O — Jenna Hambrook
Blood Manifesto — Theodore Ushev
Blue-Eyed Blonde — Pascal Plante
Blue Thunder (Bleu tonnerre) — Philippe-David Gagné, Jean-Marc E. Roy
Boxing — Grayson Moore, Aidan Shipley
Calendar Girls — Lisa Birke
The Canoe — Alex Balkam
Clouds of Autumn — Trevor Mack, Matthew Taylor Blais
Crazy House — Aaron Mirkin
Debris — John Bolton
The Dollhouse — Chad Galloway, Heather Benning
Dysmorphia — Katherine Grubb
Golden Teachers — Harry Cepka
If I Was God — Cordell Barker
Interview with a Free Man (Entrevue avec un homme libre) — Nicolas Lévesque
Kokom — Kevin Papatie
Lewis — Fantavious Fritz
Lifeguard — Devan Scott, Will Ross
Maurice — François Jaros
May We Sleep Soundly — Denis Côté
Mia — Amanda Strong, Bracken Hanuse Corlett
The Muses of Salomé — Mirek Hamet
My Enemy, My Brother — Ann Shin
My Favourite Season — Liz Cairns
Nephew — David Findlay
Never Steady, Never Still — Kathleen Hepburn
Ocean Falls — Ryan Ermacora, Jessica Johnson
The Orchard — Darcy Van Poelgeest
Penny's for Tea — Sophie Jarvis, Kane Stewart
Rebel (Bihttoš) — Elle-Máijá Tailfeathers
Rock the Box — Katherine Monk
She Stoops to Conquer — Zachary Russell
The Sleepwalker (Sonámbulo) — Theodore Ushev
Star — Émilie Mannering
Wave — Jasmin Mozaffari
Wind Through a Tree — Seth Smith
Winter Hymns — Dusty Mancinelli
World Famous Gopher Hole Museum — Chelsea McMullan

International Short Films
Adolescence — Javier Blanco
Almost Not Beautiful — Sarah Jean Kruchowski
The Aquarium — Jacobie Gray
Atlantis — Ben Russell
Behold — Mark Sargent, Maya Tsambrou
Birthday — Chris King
Cheerful Blues for the Dead Man — J. M. Quevedo Gonzalez
Cherry Cake — Jane Green
Coffee to Go — Patricia Font
Deformity Prays for Radiation — Nathan Hertz
Drift — Felipe Prado
The Error — Brando de Sica
The Exquisite Corpus — Peter Tscherkassky
The Formula — Kathrin Frey
Gloria — Luis Hernandez de la Peña
Harvey's Dream — Alexander von Hofmann
In My Shoes — Mat Govoni, Monique Schafter
In the Night — Joshua Erkman
In the Still of the Night — Erich Steiner
Injury Time — Jack Sheridan
Interior. Family — Gerard Quinto, Esteve Soler, David Torras
Last Base — Aslak Danbolt
Little Bear — Daire Glynn, Ger Duffy
Looking Out — Tristan Artin
The Man from the Council — Barnaby Southcombe
Mine — Trilby Glover
The Moor — George Kyrtsis
Mystic Jungfraujoch — Markus Eichenberger
Night Without Distance — Lois Patiño
Operator — Caroline Bartleet
Red Nuts — Jackson Mullane
A Riot — Nathan Silver
Scrabble — Cristian Sulser
Setting them Straight — Kaleb McKenna
Soap — Christopher Brown
Solo Finale — Ingo Putze
Stutterer — Benjamin Cleary
Through the Breaking Glass — Ivan Mena-Tinoco
The Train — Asher Grodman
Treading Water — Liz Cardenas Franke
Trench — Nathan Hunt

References

Vancouver
Vancouver
Vancouver
Vancouver International Film Festival